John Joseph Fisher (born June 1, 1961) is an American businessman. He is the owner of Major League Baseball's Oakland Athletics and has stakes in Major League Soccer's San Jose Earthquakes and Scotland's Celtic F.C. He is the son of Gap Inc. founders Donald Fisher and Doris F. Fisher.

Early life and education
Fisher is the son of Doris Feigenbaum Fisher and Don Fisher, the co-founders of Gap, Inc. Fisher attended Phillips Exeter Academy and Princeton University, where he received a bachelor's degree in 1983.  After college, Fisher worked in the mailroom at the Republican National Committee and worked as a fundraiser for then-President Ronald Reagan and Vice President George H. W. Bush. He then attended graduate school at Stanford University School of Business, where he earned a master's degree in Business Administration. Fisher, who is Jewish, has two brothers: Robert J. Fisher and William S. Fisher.

Career
After graduate school, he took a job for a real estate company that did business with his parents' company, the Gap. The business was not successful and he became president of Pisces Inc., the Fisher family's investment management company. He established a relationship with Lewis Wolff to jointly purchase several Fairmont hotels in San Francisco, which led to his investment in the Oakland Athletics. He also has stakes in Major League Soccer's San Jose Earthquakes and Scotland's Celtic football club.

Fisher has been the majority owner of the Athletics since he and Wolff closed on their joint purchase of the team in 2005 and is now also the managing general partner. In November 2016, Wolff sold his 10% share in the Athletics to Fisher giving Fisher full ownership of the team.

In April 2022, Forbes estimated his net worth to be $2.4 billion.

Philanthropy
Fisher chairs the board of the Knowledge Is Power Program (KIPP Foundation), dedicated to training teachers for the KIPP public charter school network., and co-chair of the Charter School Growth Fund.

Political views
In 2019, it was revealed that Fisher, with his mother Doris F. Fisher and brothers William S. Fisher and Robert J. Fisher, had donated nearly $9 million to a dark money group that opposed Barack Obama in the 2012 election.

Personal life
He is married to Laura Meier Fisher. The couple lives in San Francisco.

References

1961 births
Living people
American billionaires
American retail chief executives
Businesspeople from the San Francisco Bay Area
California Republicans
Jewish American philanthropists
Major League Baseball executives
Oakland Athletics owners
Princeton University alumni
San Jose Earthquakes executives
Stanford Graduate School of Business alumni
Fisher family
Gap Inc. people
21st-century American Jews